Plantagenet County was one of the 26 counties of Western Australia that were designated in 1829 as cadastral divisions, and was centred on the coastal settlement of Albany. It approximately corresponds to the modern-day Plantagenet Land District which forms the basis for land titles in the area.

References

External links 
Introduction to the Shire of Plantagenet
Western Australia, A History from its discovery to the inauguration of the Commonwealth

Counties of Western Australia